Sharath Kumar Bache Gowda is an Indian politician who is the current Member of the Karnataka Legislative Assembly from Hosakote in the by-election in 2019 as an Independent candidate. He belongs to Indian National Congress. He is son of Senior Bharatiya Janata Party Leader and Chikballapur Lok Sabha MP B. N. Bache Gowda. He was expelled from  primary membership and contested the assembly by-election in 2019 as independent candidate for anti-party activity.

References

1983 births
Living people
Karnataka MLAs 2018–2023
Bharatiya Janata Party politicians from Karnataka
People from Bangalore